Alexander Feliksovich Gavrilov (Алекса́ндр Фе́ликсович Гаври́лов, born 3 December 1970 in Moscow) is a Russian literary critic and editor. He was editor-in-chief of the Книжное обозрение Book Review from 2000 to 2010.

He was a finalist in the Young Creative Entrepreneur program of the British Council.

Notes

Russian literary critics
1970 births
Living people
Academic staff of the Higher School of Economics